Tetrapeptide repeat homeobox 1 is a protein that in humans is encoded by the TPRX1 gene.

Function
Homeobox genes encode DNA-binding proteins, many of which are thought to be involved in early embryonic development. Homeobox genes encode a DNA-binding domain of 60 to 63 amino acids referred to as the homeodomain. This gene is a member of the TPRX homeobox gene family. [provided by RefSeq, Jul 2008].

References

Further reading